Leptotes marina, the marine blue or striped blue, is a butterfly of the family Lycaenidae. It is found in North America and Central America.

Description
The wingspan is 22–29 mm. Adults are on wing from April to September in the north and all year round in south. Its habitats include weedy, open sites and deserts.

Ecology
The larvae feed on Astragalus, Amorpha californica, Acacia greggii, Dalea purpurea, Dolichos lablab, Galactia, Glycyrrhiza lepidota, Prosopis glandulosa, Lysiloma thornberi, Lathyrus odoratus, Medicago sativa, Lotus scoparius dendroides, Phaseolus, Wisteria sinensis and Plumbago.

Larvae are also associated with introduced Iridomyrmex humilis (Argentine ants).

References

External links

Marina
Butterflies of North America
Butterflies of Central America
Lycaenidae of South America
Fauna of the Colorado Desert
Fauna of the Sonoran Desert
Butterflies described in 1868
Taxa named by Tryon Reakirt